Killer Force, also known as The Diamond Mercenaries, is a 1976 thriller film directed by Val Guest and starring Telly Savalas, Peter Fonda and Christopher Lee. It was a co-production between the Republic of Ireland, Switzerland, United Kingdom (post production at Twickenham), and the United States and was filmed primarily in South Africa. Its plot is about a gang of criminals who plan a major robbery of a diamond mine.

Plot
Head of security Harry Webb fears that a diamond theft is about to take place at the company's major mining complex in the desert. He quickly manages to become very unpopular, particularly with Claire Chambers, a celebrated cover girl and daughter of the mine administrator. She is visiting the man she loves, Mike Bradley, who is responsible for security at the mine.

Nelson, the mine administrator, gives Bradley a curious mission—to steal a diamond. He wants to implicate Bradley in order to bring him into contact with a certain Lewis who is preparing to rob the mine with the aid of a group of mercenaries and a local accessory known as Father Christmas. Webb, not being informed of the deceit, relentlessly pursues Bradley, who is contacted by Lewis. With the mercenaries in the process of penetrating the mine, Bradley reveals himself to be Father Christmas, the organizer of the entire operation. With Webb in pursuit, Bradley flees into the desert with the only other survivors.

Cast
 Telly Savalas ...  Webb 
 Peter Fonda ...  Bradley 
 Hugh O'Brian ...  Lewis 
 Christopher Lee ...  Major Chilton 
 O. J. Simpson ...  Alexander 
 Maud Adams ...  Clare 
 Ian Yule ...  Woods 
 Michael Mayer ...  Adams 
 Victor Melleney ...  Nelson 
 Richard Loring ...  Roberts 
 Stuart Brown ...  Chambers 
 Marina Christelis ...  Danielle 
 Frank Shelley ...  Keller 
 Peter Van Dissel ...  Rick 
 Cocky Thlothlalemaje ...  Franklyn 
 Ian Hamilton ...  Doctor 
 Dale Cutts ...  Plotter 
 Don McCorkindale ...  Radio Operator 
 Marigold Russell ...  Salesgirl 
 Frank Douglas ...  Barman 
 Kevin Basel ...  Guardhouse Sergeant 
 Stuart Parker ...  Substation Guard 
 Albert Raphael ...  Vault Guard 
 Russell Newman ...  Young Guard 
 Clive Scott ...  Sky 4 Pilot 
 Robert Drayton ...  Sky 4 Navigator

Releases

DVD
The film was released as Killer Force on DVD in 2013 by Metro-Goldwyn-Mayer as part of the 12 Action Adventure Movies 3-Disc set. This marks the first time that the film has been released since the VHS era.

It is also available in a two-pack with Brannigan from Amazon.com.

Blu-ray
In May 2016, the film was released on Blu-ray in North America by Kino Lorber. The new release features a 2015 high-definition remaster. The opening credits of this release show the title as The Diamond Mercenaries; a text explanation before the movie starts explains that the film Kino received from the movie studio had those opening credits. The alternate Killer Force opening credits are available as a special feature. In addition, a previously-unseen alternate ending is included as another special feature.

References

External links

1976 films
1970s action films
Swiss thriller films
Irish thriller films
1970s thriller films
American heist films
1970s English-language films
English-language Swiss films
English-language Irish films
Films directed by Val Guest
Films shot in South Africa
American International Pictures films
1970s American films